The Bill Nunn Jr. Award is bestowed annually by the Professional Football Writers of America (PFWA) to a reporter for their "long and distinguished contribution to pro football through coverage". It is named after Bill Nunn Jr., who worked for 22 years at the Pittsburgh Courier. The award was created in 1969 and was originally named after Dick McCann, who was the first director of the Pro Football Hall of Fame.  Presentation of the award is made annually at the Pro Football Hall Enshrinement Ceremony.  Prior to 2014, the presentation was made at the Enshrinees Dinner.

The list of Nunn Award honorees is sometimes referred to as the "writer's wing" of the Hall of Fame, despite not being named as hall of famers, getting gold jackets or bronze busts like the actual hall of famers.

Award recipients

See also
J. G. Taylor Spink Award - sports writers (Baseball Writers' Association of America)
Pete Rozelle Radio-Television Award

References

Pro Football Hall of Fame
American football trophies and awards
Sports writing awards
American journalism awards
Awards established in 1969